Malani may refer to:

People 
Fiji
Roko Malani (1754–1833), eldest son of Rasolo, the first Tui Nayau (Paramount Chief of Fiji's Lau Islands)
Ratu Wilisoni Tuiketei Malani (1920-2005), Fijian chief Gonesau, medical doctor and politician.
Adi Laufitu Malani (1958-2017), Fijian chief, former medical assistant, a former Director of UNIFEM (UN Women) Pacific, former member of Fiji Senate.
Meli Malani (born 1996), Fijian swimmer

India
Nalini Malani (born 1946), Indian artist
Sundeep Malani (born 1971), Indian film director

Pakistan
Mahesh Kumar Malani, Pakistani politician

Sri Lanka
Mirihana Arachchige Nanda Malini Perera, commonly known as Nanda Malini, Sri Lankan singer
Malani Bulathsinhala (1949–2001), Sri Lankan singer

Other
Malani Horse, a rare breed of horse from the Marwar (or Jodhpur) region of India
Malani Express, an express train between Old Delhi and Jaisalmer in India
Malani (river), a river disputed between French Guiana and Suriname

Sinhalese feminine given names